Dame Phyllis Frost Centre, formerly the Deer Park Metropolitan Women's Correctional Centre (MWCC) is a maximum security women's prison located at Deer Park, Victoria, Australia. Built in 1996, it was the first privately-owned prison in Victoria, but was transferred to public ownership in 2000 and is now run by Corrections Victoria. It also houses medium security and all protection prisoners.

History
Deer Park Metropolitan Women's Correctional Centre (MWCC) was designed by Guymer Bailey Architects and built in 1996 as the first privately designed, financed and operated prison in Victoria. The centre is named after welfare worker and philanthropist Dame Phyllis Frost, who was well known for her commitment to unpopular causes, most notably helping women prisoners. As of 2008 it was Victoria's largest women's prison, holding 604 prisoners. As of June 2010 it accommodated 260 prisoners.

It is one of only two women's prisons in Victoria, the other being HM Prison Tarrengower. As HM Prison Tarrengower is minimum security mainstream, all other female prisoners (medium security, maximum security, and all protection prisoners) are imprisoned at the Dame Phyllis Frost Centre.

The prison facility was opened on 15 August 1996 and received its first prisoners that same month, many of whom had been transferred from Fairlea Women's Prison.

On 3 October 2000, the government took control of the facility and appointed an administrator under section 8F of the Corrections Act, and section 27B of the prison contract to operate the prison. On 2 November 2000, the Minister for Corrections announced the transfer of ownership and management of MWCC to the public sector.

Notable incidents
On 24 October 2003, a male prison guard was charged with raping a mentally ill prisoner who was found to be pregnant when she was transferred to the Thomas Embling Hospital, a secured psychiatric hospital, and DNA tests revealed the prison guard was the father. The guard pleaded not guilty to the charges.

In December 2007, a Department of Justice and Regulation office filing cabinet which was being moved to new offices was mistakenly discarded at a second-hand furniture shop and bought by a Point Cook couple who discovered abandoned documents in the cabinet. After lengthy court action, documents from the filing cabinet were released and revealed allegations of corruption and sexual abuse at the Dame Phyllis Frost Centre.

In November 2009, it was reported in the media that heroin and methamphetamine were "readily available" in the jail and that there had been a large increase in drug overdoses and suicide attempts among inmates at the prison. The acting operations manager was also accused of changing rosters so as to have sex with a female prison officer, including once at the jail.

In March 2018, the body of a male prison officer was found. His death was not being treated as suspicious.

In November 2021, an Indigenous woman held prisoner was transferred to Sunshine Hospital, where she later died.

Notable prisoners
 Wendy Peirce
 Judy Moran
 Renate Mokbel
 Tania Herman
Roberta Williams
 Andrea Mohr
Caroline Reed Robertson –
 Heather Parker was a former corrections officer who helped criminals escape in 1993.

References

External links
 

Dame Phyllis Frost Centre
Dame Phyllis Frost Centre
Maximum security prisons in Australia
Women's prisons in Australia
Buildings and structures in the City of Brimbank